Allan "Bull" Reval (29 March 1913 – 3 April 2005) was an Australian rules footballer who played for the Port Adelaide Football Club in the South Australian National Football League (SANFL). He also coached Port Adelaide and fellow SANFL club Glenelg Football Club. He worked as a journalist for the Sunday Mail in Adelaide.

Haydn Bunton Sr., triple Brownlow and Sandover medalist, said of Allan Reval that "Of the South Australians played against, two stand out. As far as I am concerned— 'Bull' Reval and Bob Quinn. I never saw Reval play anything but well against Victoria. He was a beauty."

References

External links

1913 births
2005 deaths
Australian rules footballers from South Australia
Port Adelaide Football Club (SANFL) players
Port Adelaide Football Club players (all competitions)
Port Adelaide Football Club (SANFL) coaches
Glenelg Football Club coaches
South Australian Football Hall of Fame inductees